Lloyds Development Capital (Holdings) Limited (LDC), is a mid-market private equity house and subsidiary of Lloyds Banking Group, established in 1981 as Lloyds Development Capital Limited. From 1999 to 2011, it was known as Lloyds TSB Development Capital Limited.

Operations
In 1991, investment exceeded £30 million for the first time and in, 2001, LDC completed its 300th investment. By 2007, investment exceeded £300 million and it completed its 400th investment.

The company operates through the following UK subsidiaries, of which it has an interest in 100% of the issued share capital:

A subsidiary not registered in the United Kingdom, LDC (Asia) Limited, located in Hong Kong, was liquidated in 2015.

Assets
 NEC Group
 UK2 Group

See also

 Lloyds Associated Banking Company
 Agricultural Mortgage Corporation

External links

LDC exits Littlefish investment with sale to Bowmark Capital

Lloyds Banking Group
1981 establishments in England